Character Building is a book published in 
Booker T. Washington. It is a collection of talks on self-development given to students and faculty at the Tuskegee Institute he was leading. Doubleday, Page & Co., New York, published the 1902 edition. Phoenix Publications, New York, reissued the book in 2005. An online edition is available at the Booker T. Washington Society website. An audiobook version is online at LibriVox.

References

1902 non-fiction books
Books by Booker T. Washington
Doubleday, Page & Company books
Self-help books